CAPS is the common name for N-cyclohexyl-3-aminopropanesulfonic acid, a chemical used as buffering agent in biochemistry.  The similar substance N-cyclohexyl-2-hydroxyl-3-aminopropanesulfonic acid (CAPSO) is also used as buffering agent in biochemistry. Its useful pH range is 9.7-11.1.

See also
CHES
Good's buffers § List of Good's buffers

References

Buffer solutions
Sulfonic acids